Vepřek may refer to:

Michal Vepřek (born 1985), Czech footballer
Vepřek, a village and administrative part of Nová Ves (Mělník District) in the Czech Republic
Vepřek Solar Park, a power plant in Vepřek